The Punta Culebra Nature Center is a visitor center located in Panama City, on one of the islands connected by the Amador Causeway. It is operated by the Smithsonian Tropical Research Institute, also located in Panamá. The center focuses mainly on marine and terrestrial science and education, conservation and interpretation of marine coastal environments in the tropics.
Among its attractions, the Fabulous Frogs of Panama, a touch tank with equinoderms and turtles are some of the exhibits found in Punta Culebra. A trail to a stretch of tropical dry forest is also part of the attractions where free roaming animals such as raccoons, sloths, green iguanas and beautiful birds and butterflies can be found.

References

External links
 Punta Culebra Nature Center official site

Natural history museums
Nature conservation in Panama
Smithsonian Institution
Museums in Panama City
Nature centers